Western Australian soccer clubs from the top three State-Based Divisions competed in 2010 for the WA State Challenge Cup, known that year as the State League Cup.

This knockout competition was won by Stirling Lions, their sixth title.

First round
A total of 32 teams took part in this stage of the competition. All 12 Clubs from the State League Premier Division and Football West State League Division 1, and 8 clubs from the Sunday League (Premier Division) (the top 8 out of 12 from the previous year's league table) entered into the competition at this stage. All matches were completed by 26 April 2010.

The draw was as follows:

Second round
A total of 16 teams took part in this stage of the competition. All matches were completed by 7 June 2010.

The draw was as follows:

Quarter finals
A total of 8 teams took part in this stage of the competition.  All matches in this round were completed on 3 July 2010.

The draw was as follows:

Semi finals
A total of 4 teams took part in this stage of the competition. All matches in this round were completed by 25 July 2010.

The draw was as follows:

Final
The 2010 State League Cup Final was held at the neutral venue of Frank Drago Reserve on 22 August.

References

External links

Football West State Cup
2010 in Australian soccer